This is a list of equipment in service with the Portuguese Army.

Infantry equipment

Artillery

Armoured vehicles

Soft skinned vehicles

Unmanned vehicles

Future equipment 
Equipment that is already in the purchase process:

 47 tactical communications vehicles, 35 of which armored;
 Anti-aircraft defense systems which include 8 weapon terminals, 2 local warning radars, 8 light missile systems integrated into armored vehicles and 8 light armored or medium armored tactical vehicles;
 Around 200 Joint Light Tactical Vehicles;
 70 to 80 military cargo trucks;
 New Unmanned aerial vehicles;
 Anti-tank guided weapons.

Others

m/963 grenade.
EWK Faltschwimmbrücken military bridge.
Bailey military bridge
Spir-ID (identifier of radioactive and nuclear materials)
Advanced Bomb Suit
Jenoptik NYXUS Bird Long Range.
Rheinmetall Vario-Ray
PASGT
Team Wendy Combat helmet
Opscore helmet
CamelBak
 DPM Camouflage
 M18 camouflage
Battlefield Management System
EID PRC-525 military radio
SIC-T Communications system
BMS-C2 Battlefield management system
AN/PEQ-16B MIPIM
 AN/PSN-11 Precision Lightweight GPS Receiver
 AN/PVS-21 night googles
 AN/PVS-5B night googles
 AN/PPQ-2 PSTAR Radar
 AN/PPS-5B Radar
AN/TPQ-36 Firefinder radar
AN/MPQ-49 Forward Area Alerting Radar
KMW Live Firing Monitoring Equipment (LFME) for Leopard 2 A6
 Military Field kitchens (KARCHËR MFK 2, SERT CR 500L and PCM 300)
Komatsu BOSS 15 tons forklift
 Manitou MHT 10180L forklift
 JCB 110W
 Caterpillar D6H
 Komatsu D65E-12
 Komatsu D65EX-18
 Komatsu WB 93R
 Dumper Volvo 86
 Dumper Volvo A25G
 Schottel Boats

Retired equipment 
Pistols
Heckler & Koch USP (Was used by Portuguese Army in some internacional missions): currently on the war reserves
SIG Sauer P228 (Was used by CTOE): currently on the war reserves
Beretta 92 (Was used by Army Police): currently on the war reserves
Walther P38
 Luger P08
Smith & Wesson Model 10
Mauser C96
Submachine guns
 Uzi m/961: currently on the war reserves
 FBP (pistola-metralhadora) m/948
 Vigneron (pistola-metralhadora) m/961
Sterling submachine gun L2A1
Sten SMG
Bergmann MP 18 7.65mm
Assault rifles and battle rifles
 SIG SG 543 (Was used by Commandos and CTOE): currently on the war reserves
IMI Galil ARM (Was used by Portuguese Paratroopers): currently on the war reserves
Heckler & Koch G3A3 (Replaced by FN SCAR L): currently on the war reserves
 FN FAL (30 000 units)
ArmaLite AR-10
M1917 Enfield
Karabiner 98k Espingarda 8 mm Mauser m/938
Sniper rifles
 Heckler & Koch PSG1: currently on the war reserves
Machine guns
Heckler & Koch HK21: currently on the war reserves
M60E3 machine gun: currently on the war reserves
Browning M1919
MG 3: currently on the war reserves
MG 42
Maschinengewehr Modell 34 (MG34)
MG13 m/944
Madsen machine gun
Vickers machine gun
Lewis machine gun
Breda Model 37 m/938 
Grenade launchers
 Heckler & Koch HK79A1
M79 grenade launcher
Anti-aircraft artillery
 Blowpipe MANPAD (57 units)
Bofors 40 mm (62 units)
Thomson-CSF Crotale (2 launching units with 1 radar)
Anti-tank weapons
 Lança Foguetes de 37mm
 Bazuca 60mm m/955
M20 "Super" Bazooka m/952
M18 recoilless rifle 57mm
M20 recoilless rifle 75mm
M67 recoilless rifle 90mm
M40A1 recoilless rifle 106mm (128 units): currently on the war reserves
Artillery
Mortar M2 60mm
Mortar 81mm French Brandt m/937
Mortar 107mm M2 4.2-inch m/951
Canon de 75 modèle 1897
15 cm sFH 18
10.5 cm leFH 18 (150 units)
Obice da 75/18 modello 34 (92 units)
BL 6-inch 26 cwt howitzer
BL 5.5-inch medium gun (227 units)
BL 4.5-inch medium field gun (120 units)
Ordnance QF 25-pounder (relegated to ceremonial role)
M101 howitzer (52 units): currently on the war reserves
OTO Melara Mod 56 (24 units)
Vehicles
Fast Attack Vehicle (6 units used by Portuguese Paratroopers)
 M3A1 Scout Car
 Chaimite (80 units)
 Daimler Dingo
 Humber Armoured Car
 Ferret (32 units)
 Panhard AML-60 (50 units)
 Panhard M3 (6 to 8 units)
 Alvis Saladin (39 units)
 M8 Greyhound
 Panhard EBR (51 units)
 M2 Half-track
 M3 Half-track
 Sexton Mk II
 Carden Loyd tankette (6 units)
 M3 Stuart (80 units)
 Vickers 6-Ton (2 units)
 Grizzly I cruiser
 Valentine Mk2 (36 units)
 M4A3E4 Sherman
 M24 Chaffee (16 units)
 M47 Patton (150 units)
 M48 Patton (65 units)
 M60A3 TTS Patton (93 units)
 M109 A2 (6 units)
 M728 (3 units)

References

Portuguese Army
Portuguese Army
Military equipment of Portugal
Army
Military of Portugal